Diego Saa (born October 18, 1980) is an Ecuadorian musician.

Biography

Early life
Diego Saa was born in Quito, Ecuador on October 18, 1980.  His full birth name is Diego Enrique Saa Villamar.  Diego began playing music when he was 13, when he started receiving private classic piano lessons. Later he started playing bass and singing in school bands.

Verde70
Recognition of his playing started in Ecuador when Verde70 released its first CD Alegre Depresion, which instantly topped Ecuador's charts for several weeks. His recognition as a member of Verde70 increased with the group's second release Ruta Melancolia, and third release  Con Cierto Cuidado.

After a hiatus from 2008 to 2014, in which Diego moved to the United States and created the Rock en Español La Gente Naranja, Verde70 released two more albums: the full length studio album Verde70, and the EP Tres A La Vez

Skankafe
Parallel to his involvement with Verde70, in 2006, Diego became a trumpet player for the Quito Ska-Punk band, Skankafe. However, Diego didn't have the opportunity to record an album with Skankafe until he returned to Ecuador after living for 4 years in the United States, where he created the band La Gente Naranja.

La Gente Naranja
After the disintegration of Verde70 in 2008, Diego relocated to Florida, where he formed the band La Gente Naranja, with whom he recorded the band's debut album Luz al Sur.

Discography

Alegre Depresion with Verde70

Released: 1999
Label: Sponsor Group
Peak Ecuador: #1 (Latin America)
Sales: 5,000+
Certifications: Platinum (ECU)

Song List

1. Un minuto

2. Me Tienes, Me Puedes, Me dueles

3. La verdad

4. Alegre Depresion

5.Muriendo por tu amor

6. Palabras

7. Azul

8. No es tan facil

9. Esta noche

10. Irremediablemente tarde

11. La lluvia

Official Singles
"Me Tienes, Me Puedes, Me Dueles" (You Have, You Can, Yo Hurt) 
#1 Ecuador
"Irremediablemente Tarde" (Irremediable Late)
#1 Ecuador
"Un Minuto" (One Minute)
#2 Ecuador

Ruta Melancolia with Verde70

Released: 2003
Label: Sponsor Group
Peak Ecuador: #1 (Latin America)
Sales: 5,000+
Certifications: Platinum (ECU)

Song List

1. No puedo estar sin ti

2. Estoy bien

3. Que distintos tu y yo

4. En la inmensidad

5. A mil kilometros

6. Ayer…talvez

7. Fuiste tu

8. Como pez en la arena

9. Cuando estoy contigo

10. Un Año despues

11. Gente que viene y va

Official Singles
"En la Inmensidad" (In the Immenseness) 
#1 Ecuador
"No puedo estar sin ti" (Can't be without you) 
#1 Ecuador
"Pez en la Arena" (Pez en la Arena) 
#3 Ecuador

Con Cierto Cuidado with Verde70

Released: 2006
Label: Sello Independiente
Peak Ecuador: #3 (Latin America)
Sales: 3,000+
Certifications: Gold (ECU)

Song List

CON CIERTO CUIDADO - DISC 1

1. Intro - En la Inmensidad

2. Como Pez En La Arena

3. Un Minuto

4. Ruta Melancolía (a 1000 Km)

5. Cuando Estoy Contigo

6. Me Tienes, Me Puedes, Me Dueles

7. Un Año Después

8. Palabras (Version Rhodes)

9. Irremediablemente Tarde

10. Ni Para Ti, Ni Para Nadie

11. Presentacion Verde 70

12. No Puedo Estar Sin Ti

CON CIERTO CUIDADO - DISC 2

1. Fuiste Tu
 
2. Que Distintos Tu y Yo

3. Ni Para Ti, Ni Para Nadie (Studio Version)

Official Singles
"Ni Para Ti Ni Para Nadie" (Neither for you nor for anyone) 
#1 Ecuador
#25 Bolivia

Luz al Sur with La Gente Naranja

Released: 2010
Label: Nextstar

Song List

1. Misil

2. Rosa En Mi Jardin

3. Luz al Sur

4. Elevador

5. Vision Platonica

6. Un Dia Mas Sin Ti

7. Lo Inexplicable

8. Diamante

9. Botellas Vacias

10. Ghetto Booty

Official Singles
"Luz al Sur" (Light from the South)

Verde70 with Verde70

Released: 2012
Label: Radar Music

Song List

1. Alas Al Viento

2. Soledad

3. Últimamente

4. Ten Cuidado!

Official Singles
"Últimamente" (Lately)

Buenos Tipos, Malos Hábitos with Skanka-Fe

Released: 2019
Label: TDF Music

Song List

1. Zapping 

2. La T.V.

3. Hit del Diario

4. Grillete con Esposas

5. Pose

6. Sancho

7. Chancho en Feria

8. Muerte en un 222 × 3

9. Tu No Man

10. Lo Monótono

Official Singles
"Pose" (Pose)

Tres a la Vez with Verde70

Released: 2020
Label: Radar Music

Song List

1. Voy con el Sol

2. Tres

3. Me Pierdo

Official Singles
"Me Pierdo" (Me Pierdo)

External links
 Luz al Sur (Light from the South) Official Video in YouTube
 La Gente Naranja Official YouTube channel
 La Gente Naranja Official website

See also
 Verde70
 La Gente Naranja

1980 births
Living people
People from Quito
Bass guitarists
Ecuadorian guitarists
21st-century bass guitarists